Oscar Wiklöf (born January 2003) is a Finnish professional footballer who plays as a midfielder for SC Freiburg II. Besides Finland, he has played in Germany.

Career
In 2022, Wiklöf signed for SC Freiburg II.

References

External links
 

2003 births
Living people
People from Mariehamn
Swedish-speaking Finns
Finnish footballers
Association football midfielders
Finland youth international footballers
IFK Mariehamn players
SC Freiburg II players
Finnish expatriate footballers
Finnish expatriate sportspeople in Germany
Expatriate footballers in Germany